USS Manitowoc has been the name of two ships in the United States Navy.

 , a tank landing ship, served from 1973 until 1993.

United States Navy ship names